Dedric Demond Willoughby (born May 27, 1974, in New Orleans, Louisiana) is an American former professional basketball player.

A 6'3" guard, Willoughby began his college basketball career at the University of New Orleans, then transferred to Iowa State University. His coach at both schools was Tim Floyd. During each of his two seasons at Iowa State, Willoughby was the runner-up for the Big 12 Conference Player of the Year Award. As a senior, he averaged 18.9 points per game and made 45% of his three-point field goal attempts.

After playing professionally in Italy, Willoughby made the roster of the Chicago Bulls for the 1999-2000 NBA season, and was reunited once again with coach Tim Floyd. He appeared in 25 games that season, registering one start, and averaged 7.6 points.

During the next season, Willoughby signed with the Sydney Kings of the Australian National Basketball League. However, he injured his knee in a practice,  and was released shortly afterward.

Willoughby later became a coach with the All-Iowa Attack youth basketball program in Ames, Iowa.

References

1974 births
Living people
American expatriate basketball people in Australia
American expatriate basketball people in Italy
American men's basketball players
Basketball players from New Orleans
Chicago Bulls players
Iowa State Cyclones men's basketball players
New Orleans Privateers men's basketball players
Shooting guards
Small forwards
Sydney Kings players
Undrafted National Basketball Association players
Viola Reggio Calabria players